Golden World Records was a record label owned by Eddie Wingate and Joanne Bratton (née Jackson, former wife of boxing champion Johnny Bratton). The recording studio was located in Detroit, Michigan, United States. The studio's national hits included "Oh How Happy" by Shades of Blue and "(Just Like) Romeo and Juliet" by The Reflections. The early, pre-Motown songs by Edwin Starr, such as "Agent Double-O-Soul", were recorded in the Golden World studio.

Golden World Records operated from 1962 to 1968.

The label and its subsidiaries were purchased by Berry Gordy in 1966 and folded into the Motown Record Corporation. The Golden World studio became Motown's "Studio B", working in support of the original Motown recording studio (Studio A) at Hitsville USA.  Before its purchase by Gordy, the studio's recordings often included moonlighting Motown back-up musicians, including James Jamerson on bass and George McGregor on percussion.

The famous clock that hung in Golden World Records is currently owned by Melodies and Memories in Eastpointe, Michigan, and is on display there. A restored old Steinway piano that Motown inherited from Golden World is now on display at the Motown Museum.

Discography

Singles

Albums
Only one album was released on the Golden World label:

(Just Like) Romeo & Juliet—The Reflections—GWLPM-300—1964

See also
 List of record labels

References

External links
 Golden World tribute page at Soulful Detroit website.
 Photo tour:  Golden World Studio

American record labels
Record labels established in 1962
Record labels disestablished in 1968